2013 Auckland Open was a darts tournament that took place in Auckland, New Zealand on 21 September 2013.

Results

Men

Women

References

2013 in darts
2013 in New Zealand sport
Darts in New Zealand
September 2013 sports events in New Zealand